Francis Dominic Nicholas Michael Rossi,  (born 29 May 1949) is an English singer, musician and songwriter. He is the co-founder, lead singer, lead guitarist and the sole continuous member of the rock band Status Quo.

Early life
Rossi was born on 29 May 1949 in Forest Hill, London. His father's side of the family were Italian ice cream merchants and had an ice cream business in South London, and his mother was a Northern Irish Roman Catholic from Liverpool. He grew up in a household with his parents, grandmother, and "lots of aunts and uncles" and was given a Roman Catholic upbringing, having been named after Saint Francis of Assisi. He spent his summer holidays as a child with an aunt in Waterloo, Merseyside. He attended Our Lady and St Philip Neri Roman Catholic Primary School in Sydenham, and then Sedgehill Comprehensive School, from which he was expelled on his last day. His desire to become a musician began after seeing The Everly Brothers live on television at a young age, after which he asked his parents to buy him a guitar for Christmas.

Career

Early career
In 1962, while attending Sedgehill Comprehensive School, Rossi became close friends with future Status Quo bassist Alan Lancaster while playing trumpet in the school orchestra. The two, along with other classmates Alan Key (drums) and Jess Jaworski (keyboards), formed a band called the Scorpions, who played their first gig at the Samuel Jones Sports Club in Dulwich. Key was later replaced by Air Cadets drummer and future Quo member John Coghlan, and the band was renamed the Spectres. The Spectres wrote their own material and played live shows; the line-up soon included Redhill-based keyboard player Roy Lynes, whom they had seen performing with a band called the Echoes who were also based in Redhill. In 1965, the Spectres played at a Butlins holiday camp in Minehead. There Rossi met his future long-time Status Quo partner Rick Parfitt, who was playing as part of another band, the Highlights. The two became close friends and agreed to continue working together. In 1966, the Spectres signed a five-year deal with Piccadilly Records, releasing three singles that failed to chart. The group again changed their name, this time to Traffic Jam, after embracing psychedelia.

Status Quo

In 1967, Traffic Jam changed its name to The Status Quo, but eventually dropped the definite article. Shortly afterward Parfitt joined the band, completing the original line-up, and beginning an almost 50-year partnership with Rossi until Parfitt's death in 2016. Rossi had written a song called "Pictures of Matchstick Men", which hit the charts in both the UK and the US in 1968, launching their hit-making career. After some years of minor success, the band reached #5 in the album charts in 1972 with Piledriver. Released on Vertigo Records, it included "Paper Plane", a song penned by Rossi and Bob Young, which was released as a single. Status Quo continued to enjoy major success in the UK, Europe, Japan, Australia and New Zealand through the 1970s and 1980s. They were the opening act of 1985's Live Aid, and Rossi wrote and co-wrote some of their biggest hits, including "Caroline" and the band's only number one single, "Down Down".

Rossi and Parfitt were the only remaining original members in the band until Parfitt's death in 2016. In 2013 and 2014, Rossi and Parfitt reunited with original Quo bandmates Lancaster and Coghlan for a series of reunion concerts. Over their career, Status Quo have sold over 128 million albums worldwide.

Other projects
In 1984, the year before Quo opened Live Aid, Rossi and Parfitt appeared on the Band Aid charity single, "Do They Know It's Christmas?" Rossi has also pursued solo projects outside Status Quo. In 1985 when the band was on hold, he recorded two singles with his longtime writing partner Bernie Frost. The single releases were "Modern Romance (I Want to Fall in Love Again)" (UK No. 54), and "Jealousy". In 1996 he issued a solo album, King of the Doghouse, which was not a commercial success, although it produced a UK No. 42 single, "Give Myself to Love". Some years earlier, in 1976, he had appeared on the soundtrack album and film All This and World War II comprising cover versions of songs by the Beatles. Although the album sleeve credits the performance of "Getting Better" to Status Quo, the track featured Rossi's vocals and the London Symphony Orchestra. In 1977, he produced and played guitar on John Du Cann's solo album The World's Not Big Enough. 3 May 2010 saw the release of his second solo album, One Step at a Time, including a re-recording of Quo's 1973 single "Caroline".

In 2013, Rossi starred as himself alongside Quo bandmate Parfitt in the adventure comedy film Bula Quo!, which followed the duo on an adventure in Fiji, getting involved in local Mafia operations on the island.

In 2019, Rossi released a joint album with UK singer and violinist Hannah Rickard, entitled We Talk Too Much on the earMusic label. The same year, he released his autobiography I Talk Too Much (published by Little, Brown), as well as announcing a spoken word tour of the UK of the same name.

Musical equipment
Rossi's guitar of choice is the Fender Telecaster, and he has used several over the years including his trademark green 1957 model with a maple fretboard, which he purchased in 1968. It was originally sunburst, but was painted green in 1970. Through the years several parts had been replaced with G&L parts, and a third pickup had been installed in a configuration much like a Stratocaster. 

He also owns two other green Fender Telecasters that are both brighter in colour and feature rosewood fretboards. One is used for the song "Down Down" and the other for "Whatever You Want". Like his main guitar they are both in a three-pickup configuration.

In December 2014, Rossi was said to be "heartbroken" when his green 1957 Telecaster, after 46 years of use, became worn beyond use—the wood having become too soft to be able to properly tune the instrument. The guitar was sold at auction in 2019 for £118,813.

For amplification Rossi uses Marshall JCM800 or JCM900 Lead series amplifiers with 4x12 cabinets and a Roland GP8 to boost his signal. The sound from his Marshall rig is blended with Vox AC30 amplifiers that are kept behind his Marshall setup. He also uses software like Amplitube in the studio.

Style
Rossi, along with the rest of Status Quo, has often been described as "uncool", including by Rossi himself; in March 2013, he called the Status Quo of  1974 "the most uncool band in the world". On stage, Rossi normally sported a black waistcoat, blue jeans and a pair of white trainers. In a December 2000 review of a Status Quo concert at Wembley Arena, Andrew Gilchrist writing for The Guardian called the white trainers "the only "visual" [the band] really have", referencing their simplistic stage show.

Interviewed by Simon Hattenstone for The Guardian in 2007, Rossi said that he had idolised Little Richard, saying: "I think that's where we got the energy. To me it's synonymous with doing rock'n'roll. If you don't commit physically, rock'n'roll doesn't really work."

Personal life

Name
Early Status Quo albums, up to 1971's Dog of Two Head, credited him as Mike Rossi. Interviewed in 1996, he explained that his own name was deemed "too poncey" by the band's original manager, "so I had to change it to Mike, a real man's name, apparently". Within the band, he is known as "Frame" or "The Gomor" (The Grand Old Man of Rock).

History with drugs and alcohol
Rossi is now teetotal and stays away from drugs, but in the past had an archetypical "rock and roll lifestyle" of alcohol and drug habits, which made him and Parfitt notorious at the height of the band's fame. Rossi has claimed to have spent £1.7 million on cocaine in the 1980s. This heavy cocaine use resulted in a piece of his nasal septum falling out, leaving a hole inside his nose which he once "pushed a cotton bud through during a TV interview" in order to demonstrate the dangers of drug addiction to young people. In October 2014, Rossi told BBC's HARDtalk that alcohol was the gateway that led to his cocaine habit.

Despite his teetotalism, in 2010 Rossi became chairman of the Glen Rossie brand of whisky, which the band used to drink whilst on tour.

Later life

Rossi was estranged from his daughter Bernadette for seventeen years after his relationship with rock publicist Elizabeth Gernon broke up. They reunited in 2007, and Bernadette and The North supported Status Quo on that year's tour.

Rossi was appointed Officer of the Order of the British Empire (OBE) in the 2010 New Year Honours for services to music and charity, along with Parfitt. Rossi said "It's one thing going out to play in front of 50,000 people but talking to the Queen – well that's quite another. We were both so humbled by the experience. I mean, this is the Queen after all. She is England, isn't she? We have grown up with her as our figurehead since we were tiny children and she's still going strong at 83. Not a very rock and roll thing to say I know, but she is simply amazing."

Rossi married his second wife Eileen in 1989 and has eight children from his two marriages. Interviewed in 2011, he said that all of his children played music professionally.

In 2019 his autobiography, I Talk Too Much, was published by the Little, Brown Book Group.

Religious beliefs
Rossi refers to himself as a lapsed Catholic.

Discography

 King of the Doghouse (1996)
 One Step at a Time (2010)
 We Talk Too Much (2019)

References

External links

 The Official Francis Rossi website
 Status Quo official website
 Interview with Francis Rossi on Rocktopia

Living people
1949 births
20th-century English singers
21st-century English singers
English people of Italian descent
English people of Northern Ireland descent
English rock guitarists
English rock singers
Musicians from Kent
Officers of the Order of the British Empire
People from Forest Hill, London
Status Quo (band) members
Lead guitarists
English male singer-songwriters
English male guitarists